Jonathan Earl Franzen (born August 17, 1959) is an American novelist and essayist. His 2001 novel The Corrections, a sprawling, satirical family drama, drew widespread critical acclaim, earned Franzen a National Book Award, was a Pulitzer Prize for Fiction finalist, earned a James Tait Black Memorial Prize, and was shortlisted for the International Dublin Literary Award. His novel Freedom (2010) garnered similar praise and led to an appearance on the cover of Time magazine alongside the headline "Great American Novelist". Franzen's latest novel Crossroads was published in 2021, and is the first in a projected trilogy.

Franzen has contributed to The New Yorker magazine since 1994. His 1996 Harper's essay "Perchance to Dream" bemoaned the state of contemporary literature. Oprah Winfrey's book club selection in 2001 of The Corrections led to a much publicized feud with the talk show host. In recent years, Franzen has become recognized for his opinions on everything from social networking services such as Twitter ("What happens to the people who want to communicate in depth, individual to individual, in the quiet and permanence of the printed word?"; "the actual substance of our daily lives is total electronic distraction") to the impermanence of e-books ("All the real things, the authentic things, the honest things, are dying off") and the self-destruction of America.

Early life and education
Franzen was born in Western Springs, Illinois, the son of Irene (née Super) and Earl T. Franzen. His father, raised in Minnesota, was the son of an immigrant from Sweden; his mother's ancestry was Eastern European. Franzen grew up in an affluent neighborhood, on 83 Webster Woods Drive in Webster Groves, a suburb of St. Louis, Missouri, and graduated with high honors from Swarthmore College, receiving a degree in German in 1981. As part of his undergraduate education, he studied abroad in Germany during the 1979–80 academic year with Wayne State University's Junior Year in Munich program. While there, he met Michael A. Martone, on whom he would later base the character Walter Berglund in Freedom. He also studied on a Fulbright Scholarship at Freie Universität Berlin in Berlin in 1981–82; he speaks fluent German. Franzen was married in 1982 and moved with his wife to Somerville, Massachusetts to pursue a career as a novelist. While writing his first novel, The Twenty-Seventh City, he worked as a research assistant at Harvard University's Department of Earth and Planetary Sciences, coauthoring several dozen papers. In September 1987, a month after he and his wife moved to New York City, Franzen sold The Twenty-Seventh City to Farrar Straus & Giroux.

Early novels
The Twenty-Seventh City, published in 1988, is set in Franzen's hometown, St. Louis, and deals with the city's fall from grace, St. Louis having been the "fourth city" in the 1870s. This sprawling novel was warmly received and established Franzen as an author to watch. In a conversation with novelist Donald Antrim for Bomb Magazine, Franzen described The Twenty-Seventh City as "a conversation with the literary figures of my parents' generation[,] the great sixties and seventies Postmoderns", adding in a later interview "I was a skinny, scared kid trying to write a big novel. The mask I donned was that of a rhetorically airtight, extremely smart, extremely knowledgeable middle-aged writer."

Strong Motion (1992) focuses mainly on a dysfunctional family, the Hollands, and uses seismic events on the American East Coast as a metaphor for the quakes that occur in family life (as Franzen put it, "I imagined static lives being disrupted from without—literally shaken. I imagined violent scenes that would strip away the veneer and get people shouting angry moral truths at each other."). A 'systems novel', the key 'systems' of Strong Motion according to Franzen are "... the systems of science and religion—two violently opposing systems of making sense in the world." The novel was not a financial success at the time of its publication. Franzen subsequently defended the novel in his 2010 Paris Review interview, remarking "I think they [critics and readers] may be overlooking Strong Motion a little bit."

Franzen taught a fiction-writing seminar at Swarthmore in the spring of 1992 and 1994:

For the 1992 class, Franzen invited David Foster Wallace to be a guest judge of the workshop pieces.

The Corrections

Franzen's The Corrections, a novel of social criticism, garnered considerable critical acclaim in the United States, winning both the 2001 National Book Award for Fiction
and the 2002 James Tait Black Memorial Prize for fiction. The novel was also a finalist for the 2001 National Book Critics Circle Award for Fiction, the 2002 PEN/Faulkner Award, and the 2002 Pulitzer Prize for Fiction (won by Richard Russo for Empire Falls).

In September 2001, The Corrections was selected for Oprah Winfrey's book club. Franzen initially participated in the selection, sitting down for a lengthy interview with Oprah and appearing in B-roll footage in his hometown of St. Louis (described in an essay in How To Be Alone titled "Meet Me In St. Louis"). In October 2001, however, The Oregonian printed an article in which Franzen expressed unease with the selection. In an interview on National Public Radio's Fresh Air, he expressed his worry that the Oprah logo on the cover dissuaded men from reading the book:

Soon afterward, Franzen's invitation to appear on Oprah's show was rescinded. Winfrey announced, "Jonathan Franzen will not be on the Oprah Winfrey show because he is seemingly uncomfortable and conflicted about being chosen as a book club selection. It is never my intention to make anyone uncomfortable or cause anyone conflict. We have decided to skip the dinner and we're moving on to the next book."

These events gained Franzen and his novel widespread media attention. The Corrections soon became one of the decade's best-selling works of literary fiction. At the National Book Award ceremony, Franzen said "I'd also like to thank Oprah Winfrey for her enthusiasm and advocacy on behalf of The Corrections."

Following the success of The Corrections and the publication of The Discomfort Zone and How to Be Alone, Franzen began work on his next novel. In the interim, he published two short stories in The New Yorker: "Breakup Stories", published November 8, 2004, concerned the disintegration of four relationships; and "Two's Company", published May 23, 2005, concerned a couple who write for TV, then split up.

In 2011, it was announced that Franzen would write a multi-part television adaptation of The Corrections in collaboration with The Squid and the Whale director Noah Baumbach for HBO. HBO has since passed on Corrections, citing "difficulty" in "adapting the book's challenging narrative, which moves through time and cuts forwards and back": that would be "difficult to sustain in a series and challenging for viewers to follow, hampering the potential show's accessibility."

In September 2019, The Corrections was voted sixteenth in a list of the 100 best books of the twenty-first century so far by writers and critics of the Guardian newspaper.

Freedom

On June 8, 2009, Franzen published an excerpt from Freedom, his novel in progress, in The New Yorker. The excerpt, titled "Good Neighbors", concerned the trials and tribulations of a couple in St. Paul, Minnesota. On May 31, 2010, a second excerpt — titled "Agreeable" — was published, also in The New Yorker.

On October 16, 2009, Franzen made an appearance alongside David Bezmozgis at the New Yorker Festival at the Cedar Lake Theatre, reading a portion of his forthcoming novel. Sam Allard, writing for North By Northwestern about the event, said that the "...material from his new (reportedly massive) novel" was "as buoyant and compelling as ever" and "marked by his familiar undercurrent of tragedy". Franzen read "an extended clip from the second chapter."

On September 9, 2010, Franzen appeared on Fresh Air to discuss Freedom in the wake of its release. Franzen has drawn what he describes as a "feminist critique" for the attention that male authors receive over female authors—a critique he supports. Franzen also discussed his friendship with David Foster Wallace and the impact of Wallace's suicide on his writing process.

Freedom was the subject of a highly unusual "recall" in the United Kingdom starting in early October 2010. An earlier draft of the manuscript, to which Franzen had made over 200 changes, had been published by mistake. The publisher, HarperCollins, initiated an exchange program, but thousands of books had been distributed by that time.

While promoting the book, Franzen became the first American author to appear on the cover of Time magazine since Stephen King in 2000. Franzen appeared alongside the headline "Great American Novelist". He discussed the implications of the Time coverage, and the reasoning behind the title of Freedom in an interview in Manchester, England, in October 2010.

On September 17, 2010, Oprah Winfrey announced that Jonathan Franzen's Freedom would be an Oprah book club selection, the first of the last season of The Oprah Winfrey Show. On December 6, 2010, he appeared on The Oprah Winfrey Show to promote Freedom where they discussed that book and the controversy over his reservations about her picking The Corrections and what that would entail.

Franzen has stated the writing of Freedom was influenced by the death of his close friend and fellow novelist David Foster Wallace.

Purity

In an interview with Portland Monthly on December 18, 2012, Franzen revealed that he currently had "a four-page, single-spaced proposal" for a fifth novel he was currently working on, although he went on to suggest that while he had a proposal there was no guarantee that what was proposed would make the final cut, saying of similar proposals for previous novels, "I look at the old proposals now, and I see the one part of them that actually got made into a book, and I think, 'How come I couldn't see that? What is all this other stuff?'". Franzen also hinted that the new novel would probably also be long, adding "I've let go of any illusion that I'm a writer of 150-page novels. I need room to let things turn around over time and see them from the whole lives of other characters, not just the single character. For better or worse, one point of view never seems to do it for me." In October 2014, during a discussion at Colgate University, Franzen read a "self-contained first-person narrative" that is part of a novel that he hoped will be out in the summer of 2015.

On November 17, 2014, The New York Times Artsbeat Blog reported that the novel, titled Purity, would be out in September. Jonathan Galassi, president and publisher of Farrar, Straus & Giroux, described Purity as a multigenerational American epic that spans decades and continents. The story centers on a young woman named Purity Tyler, or Pip, who doesn't know who her father is and sets out to uncover his identity. The narrative stretches from contemporary America to South America to East Germany before the collapse of the Berlin Wall, and hinges on the mystery of Pip's family history and her relationship with a charismatic 
hacker and whistleblower.

In 2016, Daily Variety reported that the novel was in the process of being adapted into a 20-hour limited series for Showtime by Todd Field who would share writing duties with Franzen and the playwright Sir David Hare. It would star Daniel Craig as Andreas Wolf and be executive produced by Field, Franzen, Craig, Hare & Scott Rudin.

However, in a February 2018 interview with The Times London, Hare said that, given the budget for Field's adaptation (170 million), he doubted it would ever be made, but added "It was one of the richest and most interesting six weeks of my life, sitting in a room with Todd Field, Jonathan Franzen and Daniel Craig bashing out the story. They're extremely interesting people."

Purity was a relative commercial disappointment compared to Franzen's two previous novels, selling only 255,476 copies, compared to 1.15 million copies of Freedom and 1.6 million copies of The Corrections.

A Key to All Mythologies 
On November 13, 2020, Franzen's publisher Farrar, Straus and Giroux announced the publication of Franzen's new novel, Crossroads, the first volume in a trilogy titled A Key to All Mythologies. 

Crossroads was published October 5, 2021.

The novel received mostly favorable reviews, with a cumulative "Positive" rating at the review aggregator website Book Marks, based on 48 book reviews from mainstream literary critics. Bookforum called it Franzen's "finest novel yet," his "greatest and most perfect novel," and Dwight Garner of the New York Times said it was "warmer than anything he's yet written, wider in its human sympathies, weightier of image and intellect." According to the Times Literary Supplement:Crossroads is largely free from the vices to which Franzen's previous work has been addicted: the self-conscious topicality; the show-off sophistication; the formal heavy-handedness. It retains many of his familiar virtues: the robust characterization; the escalating comedy; the virtuosic command of narrative rhythm.Critics especially praised the character of Marion, whom Garner called "one of the glorious characters in recent American fiction."

The novel is about a pastor, his wife, and four children. It's split into two sections called 'Advent' and 'Easter.' Writing for The Nation, Rumaan Alam says "in Crossroads, every plotline leads to God."

Other works

In 1996, while still working on The Corrections, Franzen published a literary manifesto in Harper's Magazine entitled Perchance to Dream. Referencing manifestos written by Philip Roth and Tom Wolfe, among others, Franzen grappled with the novelist's role in an advanced media culture which seemed to no longer need the novel. In the end, Franzen rejects the goal of writing a great social novel about issues and ideas, in favor of focusing on the internal lives of characters and their emotions. Given the huge success of The Corrections, this essay offers a prescient look into Franzen's goals as both a literary and commercially minded author.

In 2002, Franzen published a critique of the novels of William Gaddis, entitled "Mr. Difficult", in The New Yorker. He begins by recounting how some readers felt The Corrections was spoiled by being too high-brow in parts, and summarizes his own views of reading difficult fiction. He proposes a "Status model", whereby the point of fiction is to be Art, and also a "Contract model", whereby the point of fiction is to be Entertainment, and finds that he subscribes to both models. He praises The Recognitions, admits that he only got halfway through J R, and explains why he does not like the rest of Gaddis's novels.

In 2004 Franzen published "The Discomfort Zone", a personal essay about his childhood and family life in Missouri and his love of Charles M. Schulz's Peanuts, in The New Yorker. Susan Orlean selected it for the subsequent volume of The Best American Essays.

Since The Corrections Franzen has published How to Be Alone (2002), a collection of essays including "Perchance To Dream", and The Discomfort Zone (2006), a memoir. How To Be Alone is essentially an apologia for reading, articulating Franzen's uncomfortable relationship with the place of fiction in contemporary society. It also probes the influence of his childhood and adolescence on his creative life, which is then further explored in The Discomfort Zone.

In September 2007, Franzen's translation of Frank Wedekind's play Spring Awakening was published. In his introduction, Franzen describes the Broadway musical version as "insipid" and "overpraised." In an interview with New York magazine, Franzen stated that he had in fact made the translation for Swarthmore College's theater department for $50 in 1986 and that it had sat in a drawer for 20 years since. After the Broadway show stirred up so much interest, Franzen said he was inspired to publish it because "I knew it was a good translation, better than anything else out there."

Franzen published a social commentary on cell phones, sentimentality, and the decline of public space, "I Just Called To Say I Love You" (2008), in the September/October 2008 issue of MIT Technology Review.

In 2012 he published Farther Away, a collection of essays dealing with such topics as his love of birds, his friendship with David Foster Wallace, and his thoughts on technology.

In 2013, Franzen published The Kraus Project. It consists of three major essays by the "Perennially ... impossible to translate" Austrian "playwright, poet, social commentator and satirical genius" Karl Kraus – ""Heine and the Consequences" a takedown of the beloved German poet, "Nestroy and Posterity" which established that playwright's reputation in Austria to this day, and "Afterword to Heine and the Consequences"". The essays are accompanied by "Franzen's [own] plentiful, trenchant yet off-beat annotations" taking on "... Kraus' mantle-commenting on what Kraus would say (and what Franzen's opinion is) about Macs and PCs; decrying Twitter's claim of credit for the Arab Spring; and unfurling how media conglomerates influence politics in their quest for profits."

Franzen published his third essay collection, The End of the End of the Earth: Essays, in November 2018. According to advance press for the book, the collection "gathers essays and speeches written mostly in the past five years, [and] Jonathan Franzen returns with renewed vigor to the themes—both human and literary—that have long preoccupied him. Whether exploring his complex relationship with his uncle, recounting his young adulthood in New York, or offering an illuminating look at the global seabird crisis, these pieces contain all the wit and disabused realism that we've come to expect from Franzen.
Taken together, these essays trace the progress of a unique and mature mind wrestling with itself, with literature, and with some of the most important issues of our day, made more pressing by the current political milieu. The End of the End of the Earth is remarkable, provocative, and necessary."

In September 2019, Franzen published an essay on climate change in The New Yorker entitled "What If We Stopped Pretending?", which generated controversy among scientists and online pundits because of its alleged pessimism. The term doomerism became popular amid the response to the piece. A Sierra Club interview with Franzen, from January 2019 further explores Franzen's feelings about climate change and action.

In an interview with Transatlantica conducted in March 2018, Franzen mentioned that he had just started work on a new novel, having recently sold it to publishers on the basis of a three-page proposal. Later that year in a profile piece for The New York Times Magazine in June 2018, Franzen confirmed that he was currently at work on the early stages of his sixth novel, which he speculated could be his last. "So, I may be wrong ... But somehow this new one really does feel like my last.". Subsequently, in an interview reproduced on The Millions website in April 2020, Franzen mentioned that he was "almost done" with writing this sixth novel. Crossroads: A Novel was published on October 5, 2021.

Philosophy of writing

During a lecture on autobiography and fiction, Franzen discussed four perennial questions often asked of him by audiences, all of which annoy or bother him in some way. They are:

 Who are your influences?
 What time of day do you work, and what do you write on?
 I read an interview with an author who says that, at a certain point in writing a novel, the characters "take over" and tell him what to do. Does this happen to you, too?
 Is your fiction autobiographical?

In the lecture he said of the third question in particular "This one always raises my blood pressure" and quoted Nabokov in response.

In February 2010, Franzen (along with writers such as Richard Ford, Margaret Atwood, and Anne Enright) was asked by The Guardian to contribute what he believed were ten serious rules to abide by for aspiring writers.

Personal life
In his early twenties, Franzen was married to fellow writer Valerie Cornell. They lived in New York City and were married for fourteen years. His marriage and divorce are mentioned in some of his essays in the collection Farther Away.

Franzen lives in Santa Cruz, California, with his "spouse-equivalent", writer Kathy Chetkovich.

As first reported in his essay "My Bird Problem," Franzen is well known as a serious birdwatcher. He appeared on CBS Sunday Morning in March 2018 to discuss his love of birds and birdwatching. Franzen served for nine years on the board of the American Bird Conservancy. A feature-length documentary based on Franzen's reported essay "Emptying the Skies" was released in 2013.

Franzen is a longtime fan of the punk-rock collective The Mekons; he appeared in the 2014 documentary Revenge of the Mekons to discuss the group's importance to him.

In 2010, at an event at the Serpentine Pavilion in London celebrating the launch of Freedom, Franzen's glasses were stolen from his face by a gate-crasher, who jokingly attempted to ransom them for $100,000 before being apprehended by police elsewhere in Hyde Park.

Awards and honors 
1981 Fulbright Scholarship to Germany
1988 Whiting Award
1996 Guggenheim Fellowship
2000 Berlin Prize (American Academy in Berlin)
2001 National Book Award (Fiction) for The Corrections
2001 Salon Book Award (Fiction) for The Corrections
2002 James Tait Black Memorial Prize winner (Fiction) for The Corrections
2010 Salon Book Award (Fiction) for Freedom
2010 Galaxy National Book Awards, International Author of the Year, Freedom
2011 Heartland Prize for Freedom
2011 John Gardner Award (Fiction) for Freedom
2012 Carlos Fuentes Medal (Inaugural award)
2013 Welt-Literaturpreis
2015 Budapest Grand Prize
 2015 Euronatur Award for outstanding commitment to nature conservation in Europe
2017 Frank Schirrmacher Preis
2022 Thomas Mann Prize

Honors and other recognition
1996 Granta's Best Of Young American Novelists
2001 The New York Times Best Books of the Year for The Corrections
2001 National Book Critics Circle Award finalist (for The Corrections)
2001 Oprah's Book Club Selection (for The Corrections)
2002 Pulitzer Prize finalist (Fiction)
2002 PEN/Faulkner Award finalist
2003 International Dublin Literary Award (short list)
2009 Richard C. Holbrooke Distinguished Visitor American Academy in Berlin
2010 National Book Critics Circle Award finalist (for Freedom)
2010 The New York Times 100 Notable Books of 2010 list (for Freedom)
2010 The New York Times Best Books of the Year (for Freedom)
2010 Oprah's Book Club selection (for Freedom)
2010 Los Angeles Times Book Prize (Fiction) finalist (for Freedom)
2010 Elected to the Akademie der Kunste, Berlin
2011 Named one of Time Magazine's Time 100
2012 Elected to the American Academy of Arts and Letters
2012 Elected to the French Ordre des Arts et des Lettres
2013 National Book Critics Circle Award (Criticism) shortlist for The Kraus Project
In January 2011, The Observer named him as one of "20 activists, filmmakers, writers, politicians and celebrities who will be setting the global environmental agenda in the coming year".
On May 21, 2011, Franzen delivered the commencement address at Kenyon College to the class of 2011.
 On June 16, 2012, Franzen delivered the commencement address at Cowell College, UC Santa Cruz
The first international academic symposium solely dedicated to Franzen's work took place at Glasgow University, UK, March 22, 2013. Another one, "Jonathan Franzen: Identity and Crisis of the American Novel", was scheduled to take place at the University of Córdoba, Spain, April 18–19, 2013.

Bibliography

Novels

Short fiction

Non-fiction 
  Essays.
  Memoir.
  Essays.
 
 
  Guest editor.
 
  Essays.

Translations
 Spring Awakening by Frank Wedekind 2007
 The Kraus Project (essays by Karl Kraus translated and annotated by Franzen) 2013

Critical studies and reviews of Franzen's work

Television appearances
In 1996, Franzen appeared on Charlie Rose with friend and fellow author David Foster Wallace and author Mark Leyner to debate "The Future of American Fiction."
In 2001, Franzen appeared on Charlie Rose, on November 21, 2001 to discuss The Corrections; and again on December 27 after winning the National Book Award for The Corrections.
In 2002, Franzen appeared on Charlie Rose (October 30, 2002) to discuss his essay collection How to Be Alone.
In 2006, Franzen guest starred alongside Michael Chabon, Tom Wolfe, and Gore Vidal in The Simpsons episode "Moe'N'a Lisa", which first aired November 19, 2006. In the episode, he is depicted fighting over literary influences with Chabon.
In 2010, Franzen appeared on The Oprah Winfrey Show in support of her selection of Freedom for Oprah's Book Club. Several viewers noted the brevity of Franzen's appearance on the show, although a thirty-minute "After the Show" Q&A was later made available online.
In 2015, Franzen appeared on The Late Show with Stephen Colbert and CBS This Morning to promote the release of Purity.
In 2016, Franzen appeared on Jeopardy! as part of the show's Power Players Week, where journalists and intellectuals compete on the show with winnings donated to the player's charity of choice—Franzen played for the American Bird Conservancy. Franzen also appeared on Late Night with Seth Meyers.
In 2018, Franzen appeared on CBS This Morning – Saturday to discuss his love of birds and birdwatching.

References

Further reading
 Burn, Stephen J. Jonathan Franzen at the End of Postmodernism. London/New York 2011.
 Freitag, Sibylle. The Return of the Real in the Works of Jonathan Franzen. Essen (Germany) 2009.
Miceli, Barbara. "A cancer on the planet": Mountaintop Removal and Environmental Crime in Jonathan Franzen's Freedom" in Forum Filologiczne Ateneum 1(7) 2019, pp. 343–356.
 Weinstein, Philip. Jonathan Franzen: The Comedy of Rage. Bloomsbury, 2015.

External links

  – official site
 Jonathan Franzen on the cover of Time magazine
 Jonathan Franzen acceptance speech following National Book Award win
 

1959 births
Living people
People from Western Springs, Illinois
People from Webster Groves, Missouri
Novelists from Illinois
Novelists from Missouri
Writers from Missouri
American male essayists
American male novelists
American memoirists
American people of Swedish descent
National Geographic people
The New Yorker people
Postmodern writers
Birdwatchers
Swarthmore College alumni
Webster Groves High School alumni
National Book Award winners
PEN/Faulkner Award for Fiction winners
James Tait Black Memorial Prize recipients
Members of the Academy of Arts, Berlin
20th-century American essayists
20th-century American male writers
20th-century American novelists
21st-century American essayists
21st-century American male writers
21st-century American novelists
Members of the American Academy of Arts and Letters
Fulbright alumni